Klaus Wiener (born 21 August 1962) is a German economist and politician of the Christian Democratic Union (CDU) who has been serving as a member of the Bundestag since 2021, representing the Mettmann I district. He previously held positions as economist for the German Insurance Association (GDV), Generali, WestLB and Commerzbank.

Early life and education 
Wiener was born 1962 in the West German town of Nordhorn and studied economics.

Political career 
Wiener joined the CDU in 2005.

Wiener was directly elected to the Bundestag in 2021 for Mettmann. In parliament, he has since been serving on the Committee on the Environment, Nature Conservation, Nuclear Safety and Consumer Protection.

Other activities 
 Nuclear Waste Disposal Fund (KENFO), Member of the Board of Trustees (since 2022)

References 

Living people
1962 births
People from Nordhorn
German politicians
Members of the Bundestag 2021–2025
Members of the Bundestag for the Christian Democratic Union of Germany